The 2014–15 Mississauga Power season was the fourth and final season of the franchise in the National Basketball League of Canada (NBL). It was also their second season in Mississauga. Following an unsuccessful season with a record of 7–25, the Power folded, resulting in the creation of Raptors 905, a new NBA Development League affiliate to the NBA's Toronto Raptors.

Roster

Transactions

Trades

Free agents

Additions

Subtractions

References

External links 
NBL Canada Recent Transactions

Mississauga Power seasons
Miss